Enclave of Police was an area centred on the town of Police, in the District of the Western Pomerania, Poland, that was under the administration of the Red Army of the Soviet Union, from 5 October 1945 to 25 September 1946. It was independent of Polish administration, but remained within its territory

History 
The enclave was established on 5 October 1945 by the Red Army from part of the Randow District of the Poland as an area independent of Polish administration. It was formed to secure and move to the Soviet Union the machines and resources of the Hydrierwerke Pölitz AG factory that produced liquid hydrocarbons from coal. The area had over 20 thousand workers and prisoners of war from Germany and Poles weren't allowed to settle in the enclave.

The Enclave of Police was divided into 2 zones: A and B. Zone A stretched from the south of Police to Stołczyn and existed until 19 July 1946. Zone B stretched from the north of Police to Trzebież and existed up to 25 September 1946. It was around 90 km2 (35 square miles) at its largest.

The enclave was abolished on 25 September 1946, with its territories being returned to Polish administration.

Citations

Notes

References 

Police, West Pomeranian Voivodeship
Police County
Police, enclave
Police, enclave
1945 establishments in Poland
1946 disestablishments in Poland
Poland–Soviet Union relations
Poland–Soviet Union border
Police, enclave
History of Pomerania
History of Szczecin
Police, enclave
Aftermath of World War II in Germany
Police, enclave
Police, enclave